Justice Chellappah Nagalingam, KC (25 October 1893 – 25 October 1958) was a leading Ceylonese judge and lawyer. He was a Judge of the Supreme Court of Ceylon and served as acting Governor-General of Ceylon in 1954. He also served as acting Chief Justice, acting Legal Secretary and Attorney General. He was the first Ceylon Tamil to be appointed to the bench of the Supreme Court of Ceylon.

Early life and family
Nagalingam was born on 25 October 1893. He was the son of Chellappah and Meenachchi from Urumpirai in Northern Province of Ceylon. He hailed from a distinguished family and had four eminent brothers: C. Suntharalingam, a member of parliament and government minister; C. Panchalingam, a medical doctor; C. Amirthalingam, Director of Fisheries; and C. Thiagalingam, a leading lawyer. Nagalingam was educated at St. John's College, Jaffna and Royal College, Colombo where he excelled in studies and sports and won the De Soysa Science Prize. Thereafter he entered Ceylon Law College, qualifying as an advocate in 1917.

Nagalingam married Gnanam, daughter of Vaithilingam. They had two sons (Yogalingam and Bakthilingam) and four daughters (Maheswari, Sarveswari, Vigneswari and Nandeswari).

Career
After Nagalingam was called to the bar, he practised law in Colombo until 1937. In 1938 he was appointed as an Additional District Judge of Colombo. He was appointed District Judge of Kandy in 1941 and acting Attorney General in 1946. He was also appointed King's Counsel in 1946. In 1947 he became acting Legal Secretary, one of the three official members of the State Council, heading committee of justice with ministerial rank in the Board of Ministers. He was also called to the bench as an acting Puisne Judge and was confirmed judge of the Supreme Court in 1947, the first Tamil to hold that post. He was later appointed Senior Supreme Court Judge and acted as Chief Justice on a number of occasions. In this capacity he was called upon to briefly serve as acting Governor-General in 1954 whilst Lord Soulbury was out of the country.

Nagalingam was chairman of the Civil Courts Commission and the Salaries Commission, and member of the Council of Legal Education and the Judicial Service Commission.

Nagalingam was one of the founders of the Hindu Educational Society which founded the Colombo Hindu College in 1951.

Nagalingam died on 25 October 1958.

References

1893 births
1958 deaths
Acting Chief Justices of Ceylon
Alumni of Royal College, Colombo
Alumni of St. John's College, Jaffna
Attorneys General of British Ceylon
British Ceylon judges
Ceylonese advocates
Ceylonese Queen's Counsel
District Courts of Sri Lanka judges
Governors-general of Ceylon
People from Northern Province, Sri Lanka
Puisne Justices of the Supreme Court of Ceylon
20th-century King's Counsel
Sri Lankan Tamil judges
Sri Lankan Tamil lawyers